Vicente Bergues (born 19 July 1939) is a Paraguayan sports shooter. He competed in the mixed skeet event at the 1984 Summer Olympics.

References

1939 births
Living people
Paraguayan male sport shooters
Olympic shooters of Paraguay
Shooters at the 1984 Summer Olympics
Place of birth missing (living people)